Iceland–Russia relations are the relations between the two countries, Iceland and Russia. Russia has an embassy in Reykjavík. Iceland has an embassy in Moscow, and  two honorary consulates in Murmansk and Saint Petersburg. Both countries have close ties in financing, which has strengthened the relations between the two.

History
Iceland recognized the Soviet Union on June 22, 1926. In 1927, the governments of both countries exchanged notes about commercial relations, granting each other favorable trade conditions.
Direct diplomatic relations between the Soviet Union and Iceland were established on October 4, 1943. In December 1955 the missions in Moscow and Reykjavik were upgraded to embassies. From 1975 to 1991 a trade representative of USSR was in Iceland and Russia had one in Iceland from 1991 to 1995. In 1997, the first Russian-Icelandic dictionary was published by Helgi Haraldsson.

The intersection of the interests of the Soviet Union and Iceland fishery began after World War II, so that already in 1949, to the shores of Iceland was sent for fish Soviet expedition of four vessels The Soviet scientists have made a great contribution to the study of Iceland. In 1971–1973, he worked in the island complex geodynamic Soviet expedition in the "Geodynamic Project", which was headed by Vladimir Belousov. The first geological map of Iceland was drawn up on the results of operations. At the same time the study was carried out of the seabed in waters surrounding the island.

Former President of Iceland Ólafur Ragnar Grímsson went to Russia from April 18, 2002 to April 24, 2002. Grimsson visited Saint-Petersburg, Moscow, Novgorod and Salekhard.

In 2008 Prime Minister Geir Haarde has sent a delegation to Russia to negotiate a £3bn (€4bn) capital injection into the country's finances, after the country's traditional Western allies refused to help the collapsing banking system. The loan was later renegotiated to $500 million after Iceland managed to secure loans from Scandinavian countries and the International Monetary Fund, but finally Russia refused to lend any amount to Iceland.

Cooperation between the two countries is developing in different directions:

 inter-parliamentary cooperation,
 trade and economic relations,
 cooperation in the field of fisheries in the framework of NAFO, NEAFC, IWC,
 in the field of "clean energy" partnership (renewable energy sources)
 cultural interaction (exchange of exhibitions, the annual Days of Russian Culture in Iceland)

Towards the end of March 2018, Iceland suspended high-level bilateral dialogue with Russian authorities. As a result, leaders of Iceland did not attend the 2018 World Cup in Russia. This was due to the Poisoning of Sergei Skripal in Salisbury, England. In a statement on their website, Icelandic officials stated that the Russian response to the attack was "severely lacking" and did not showcase as to how a nerve agent produced in Russia came to be used against civilians in the United Kingdom. Unlike other countries who took action against Russia in response to the incident, Russia did not respond to Iceland's approach.

Trade
In 2003 Russian-Icelandic trade was $US 89.7 million. Export from Iceland to Russia was $US 13.8 million. Import were $US 75.9 million. Russia is the 9th largest exporter to Iceland. Russian exports are raw materials: oil products (62,3%), aluminium (27%). Iceland exports to Russia ships and vessels (25,1%), sea products (23,3%), textiles and garment (14,9%), chemical fertilizers (10,8%), and industrial equipment (9,5%).

See also
Foreign relations of Iceland
Foreign relations of Russia
Russians in Iceland
Icelandics in Russia

References

External links
Icelandic embassy in Moscow 
 Russian embassy in Reykjavík 

 
Russia
Bilateral relations of Russia